Taxila Cantonment Junction Railway Station (Urdu and ) is located in Taxila cantonment area near Taxila, Rawalpindi district of Punjab province, Pakistan.

See also
 List of railway stations in Pakistan
 Pakistan Railways

References

External links

Railway stations in Rawalpindi District
Railway stations on Karachi–Peshawar Line (ML 1)